is a 1991 Sega Mega Drive Formula One video game based on the career of Satoru Nakajima. Nakajima was the first full-time Japanese racer in the history of Formula One. In fact, this was the first game that Nakajima endorsed for a Japanese video gaming system. The entire 1991 Formula One season can be re-enacted with any of the notable contenders from the prestigious Formula One racing organization.

Gameplay

General gameplay
The action is viewed from the top and practice sessions can be done before actually racing. Player's name are entered using ASCII letters that are traditionally used for the English language. However, the options and track details are in Japanese and literacy is required in order to understand the rules and principles of the game.

In the season mode, the player makes up the last name of his character. He must audition for a team and must qualify for all of his races on time. If the player fails to qualify for a race, he automatically receives zero points and sees a picture of himself looking at the night time sky. Each teams has requirements and if they are not met, then the player is fired from the racing team. Depending on how good a player qualifies in the test teack (known in the game as Auto Police), either many or few teams will be knocking on the player's metaphorical door. Different teams have different requirements in order to stay employed. Unlike its sequel F1 Super License: Nakajima Satoru, going to the pit stop is needed to do repairs on the car. Repairing the car can either be set to automatic or manual on the setup menu.

Transmission can also be shifted from manual transmission to automatic transmission. However, the player still needs to shift from neutral to first gear even while in automatic transmission; like in most Formula One games. The maximum number of laps that can be attempted is five. The five-lap rules applies to practice, qualifying, in addition to the actual race itself.

F1 Season Drivers
  Eddie Chemer (Eddie Cheever)
  Ivan Capella (Ivan Capelli)
  Jonatan Pulmer (Jonathan Palmer)
  Derec Warwich (Derek Warwick)
  Michele Alboreta (Michele Alboreto) (Level 1)
  Tierry Bietsen (Thierry Boutsen) (Level 2)
  Alesandro Nannimi (Alessandro Nannini) (Level 3)
  Nigel Manselo (Nigel Mansell) (Level 4)
  Nelson Pequet (Nelson Piquet) (Level 5)
  Gelgard Gerger (Gerhard Berger) (Level 6)
  Airton Zenna (Ayrton Senna) (Level 7)
  Alain Brost (Alain Prost) (Level 8)
  Satoru Nakajima (Level 9)

F1 Constructors
 Honta (Honda) (4-speed manual transmission)
 Very fast in slow corners, then has great acceleration in second, third and fourth. The game's most competitive car. The only drawback is that it fails to start.
 Perrari (Ferrari) (automatic transmission)
 This car is competitive, it only has the advantage when there is fast cornering. The car has automatic transmission and is easy to manage.
 Muken (Mugen) (4-speed manual transmission)
 It is a medium-fast speed car because better than the Honta and the Perrari and has high speed. But there is something different on acceleration. The rest is all balanced and decent. This car is the ace in medium-fast or medium-slow curves.
 Suharu (Subaru) (4-speed manual transmission)
 It is the game's car. But it fails on acceleration and speed. The player doesn't have an advantage in anything. In addition, the Suharu is very easy to move forward.

How to obtain points
 First place = 5 points
 Second place = 4 points
 Third place = 3 points
 Fourth place = 2 points
 Fifth place = 1 points
 Sixth place or below = no points

See also
 Nakajima Satoru Super F-1 Hero, the game that Satoru Nakajima endorsed for the Super Famicom
 Satoru Nakajima F-1 Hero GB World Championship '91, the game that Satoru Nakajima endorsed for the Game Boy

References

1991 video games
Formula One video games
Japan-exclusive video games
Satoru Nakajima video games
Sega Genesis games
Sega Genesis-only games
Varie games
Video games developed in Japan